The Premier League is an association football league that serves as the top tier of the English football league system. The league was founded in 1992 when the clubs of the First Division decided to break away from the Football League, as a commercially independent entity that negotiated its own broadcast and sponsorship agreements.

Since the 2012–13 season, a player needs to have played in a minimum of five matches for a title-winning team to qualify for a medal. This is down from the previous standard of 10 matches played. At the discretion of the Premier League board, additional medals can be awarded to players who played less than five matches. This special dispensation is usually reserved for back-up goalkeepers and players who did not make the minimum number of appearances through injury. For the first season in 1992–93, players received a miniature version of the trophy rather than a medal.

As of the end of the 2021–22 season, seven clubs have won the title – Manchester United, Blackburn Rovers, Arsenal, Chelsea, Manchester City, Leicester City and Liverpool – with 593 medals awarded to 292 players. Ten players have won the title with more than one club. Having won 13 Premier League championships, Manchester United have more title-winning players to their name than any other club, with 86 players awarded 247 medals. Ryan Giggs, who spent his entire career at the club, has won more medals than any other player with 13. Over a third of medals have been awarded to English players and the next most frequent nationalities of winners are French and Brazilian.

Key
The list is initially ordered first by number of medals, then by season, and then if necessary by alphabetical order.
Position key: GK – Goalkeeper; DF – Defender; MF – Midfielder; FW – Forward.
Club (X) denotes the number of times a player won a medal with that club.

List of Premier League winning players

By nationality

By club

Notes

References

Winning players
Association football player non-biographical articles
Premier League